A Day of Roses in August is a 1927 German silent film directed by Max Mack and starring Eduard von Winterstein, Margarete Schön, and Ernst Rückert. It was shot at the Johannisthal Studios in Berlin. The film's sets were designed by the art director Kurt Richter. The film takes place in August 1914 at the beginning of the First World War.

Cast

References

Bibliography

External links

1927 films
Films of the Weimar Republic
Films directed by Max Mack
German silent feature films
German World War I films
German black-and-white films
1920s German films
1927 war films
Films shot at Johannisthal Studios